Sarde in saor (sardèe in saór) are an appetizer based on fried sardines, seasoned with sweet and sour onions, pine nuts and raisins, typical of Venetian cuisine. They are often served as snacks in Venetian bacari.

"Saor" means "flavor" in the Venetan.

Origins 
Sarde in saor was invented as a method of preservation used by Venetian fishermen who had the need to keep food on board for a long time or as long as possible.

Once the onions were cooked with vinegar and oil, they were laid in layers interspersed with fried sardines in terracotta containers. As time passed by, the recipe acquired more refined taste tones; in fact, raisins were added in order to help digestion and to sweeten mouth and breath of its tasters, with understandable relational implications.

The modern recipe also calls for pine nuts.

Since the fishermen ate the sarde in saor after a long time had passed from the moment of their preparation, they savored the taste and aroma of a product which was often no longer fresh.

For this reason, even today, when preparing sardines in saor, it is a good rule to eat them at least after one day of settling.

Note

Other projects 
  Wikimedia Commons contiene immagini o altri file su Saor

External links 

 

Onion-based foods
Cuisine of Veneto
Italian cuisine
Fish dishes